Monogem is the debut self-titled extended play by Mexican-American singer and songwriter Monogem, which was released worldwide on February 3, 2015. The album was supported by four singles: Follow You, Wait and See, Stay With Me, and The Glow.

Background 
After leaving in Top 15 in season eleven of American Idol, Jennifer Hirsh re-evaluated her music and sound. She draws inspiration from electronic dance music such as Grimes and James Blake. She later contacted her high school friend and producer, Scott Michael Smith. Together, Smith mixed Hirsh's soul-filled vocals, modern rhythms, giving rise to Hirsh's alter ego, Monogem.

Release and promotion 
Monogem announced a limited edition bone white vinyl for her debut extended play through Turntable Kitchen, a subscription service. The second single, "Wait and See", was placed on Top 13 for BuzzFeed’s Perfect Pop Songs from 2015.

Singles 
On June 2, 2013, Monogem release her debut single called "Follow You" through SoundCloud, then later on through other platforms. A year later, Monogem released two singles: "Wait and See" on March 31, 2014; and "Stay With Me" on September 20, 2014.

Track listing

Release history

References 

2015 debut EPs
Self-released EPs
Pop music EPs
EPs by American artists
Monogem albums